HMS Peterel was a Rosario-class sloop of the Royal Navy.

Peterel served three commissions as a warship, on the North America and West Indies Station, the Cape of Good Hope Station and the Pacific Station.

The ship's figurehead has survived and after restoration in 2005 was placed on display at the Apprentice Exhibition in the Portsmouth Historic Dockyard.

References

1860 ships
Ships built in Plymouth, Devon
Rosario-class sloops